Lino Sima Ekua Avomo (born 4 April 1957 in Mongomo, Equatorial Guinea, died February 23, 2013) was the Permanent Representative of Equatorial Guinea to the United Nations, with jurisdiction in Canada.  He presented his credentials to Secretary-General Kofi Annan on 21 May 2003.

Education
Sima Ekua Avomo attended the Diplomatic School of Madrid, Spain and the Carlos Lwanga National Institute of Secondary Education in Bata, Equatorial Guinea.

Career
Sima Ekua Avomo served as Minister of State for International Cooperation and Francophone Affairs prior to his appointment to the United Nations.  He has also served as Director General of International Cooperation in the Ministry of Foreign Affairs, International Cooperation and Francophone Affairs, Ambassador to France with jurisdiction in the United Kingdom, Portugal and Switzerland, and representative to the United Nations Office at Geneva. From 1990 until 1995, he served as Ambassador of Equatorial Guinea in the People's Republic of China with jurisdiction in North Korea, Japan and Indonesia. He has also been First Secretary in the Embassy of Equatorial Guinea in Addis Ababa, Ethiopia, and representative to the Organization of African Unity from 1984 until 1990. From 1982 to 1984, he served as Second Secretary in Equatorial Guinea's Embassy in the Union of Soviet Socialist Republics. from 1980 until 1982, he served as third Secretary of Equatorial Guinea embassy in Cameroon.

See also

List of Permanent Representatives to the UN

References

New Permanent Representative of Equatorial Guinea presents credentials

External links
Permanent Mission of Equatorial Guinea to the UN

1957 births
Living people
Permanent Representatives of Equatorial Guinea to the United Nations
Ambassadors of Equatorial Guinea to France
Ambassadors of Equatorial Guinea to the United Kingdom
Ambassadors of Equatorial Guinea to Portugal
Ambassadors of Equatorial Guinea to Switzerland
People from Mongomo